Y, or y, is the twenty-fifth and penultimate letter of the Latin alphabet, used in the modern English alphabet, the alphabets of other western European languages and others worldwide. According to some authorities, it is the sixth (or seventh if including W) vowel letter of the English alphabet.  In the English writing system, it mostly represents a vowel and seldom a consonant, and in other orthographies it may represent a vowel or a consonant. Its name in English is wye (pronounced ), plural wyes.

Name
In Latin, Y was named I graeca ("Greek I"), since the classical Greek sound , similar to modern German ü or French u, was not a native sound for Latin speakers, and the letter was initially only used to spell foreign words. This history has led to the standard modern names of the letter in Romance languages – i grego in Galician, i grega in Catalan, i grec in French and Romanian, i greca in Italian – all meaning "Greek I". In Dutch, the letter is either only found in loanwords, or is practically equivalent to the digraph IJ. Hence, both Griekse ij and i-grec are used, as well as ypsilon. In Spanish, Y is also called i griega; however, in the twentieth century, the shorter name ye was proposed and was officially recognized as its name in 2010 by the Real Academia Española, although its original name is still accepted.

The original Greek name υ ψιλόν (upsilon) has also been adapted into several modern languages. For example, it is called Ypsilon in German, ypsilon in Dutch,  i in Icelandic. Both names are used in Italian, ipsilon or i greca; likewise in Portuguese, ípsilon or i grego. In Faroese, the letter is simply called seinna i ("later i") because of its later place in the alphabet.

Old English borrowed Latin Y to write the native Old English sound  (previously written with the rune yr ). The name of the letter may be related to 'ui' (or 'vi') in various medieval languages; in Middle English it was 'wi' , which through the Great Vowel Shift became the Modern English 'wy' .

History

The oldest direct ancestor of English letter Y was the Semitic letter waw (pronounced as ), from which also come F, U, V, and W. See F for details. The Greek and Latin alphabets developed from the Phoenician form of this early alphabet.

Since Late Middle English, the letter Y came to be used in a number of words where earlier Middle English spelling contained the letter yogh (Ȝȝ), which developed from the letter G, ultimately from Semitic gimel – as described below (As a side note - Modern Greek lowercase gamma  is somewhat similarly shaped to the lowercase letter ).

Vowel
The form of the modern letter Y is derived from the Greek letter upsilon. It dates back to the Latin of the first century BC, when upsilon was introduced a second time, this time with its "foot" to distinguish it. Because  was not a native sound of Latin, Latin speakers had trouble pronouncing it, and it was usually pronounced . Some Latin words of Italic origin also came to be spelled with 'y': Latin silva ('forest') was commonly spelled sylva, in analogy with the Greek cognate and synonym ὕλη.

The letter Y was used to represent the sound  in the writing systems of some other languages that adopted the Latin alphabet. In Old English and Old Norse, there was a native  sound, and so Latin U, Y and I were all used to represent distinct vowel sounds. But, by the time of Middle English,  had lost its roundedness and became identical to I ( and ). Therefore, many words that originally had I were spelled with Y, and vice versa. It may be observed that a similar merger of  into  happened in Greek around the beginning of the 2nd millennium, making the distinction between iota (Ι, ι) and upsilon (Υ, υ) purely a matter of historical spelling there as well.

In Modern English, Y can represent the same vowel sounds as the letter I. The use of the letter Y to represent a vowel is more restricted in Modern English than it was in Middle and early Modern English. It occurs mainly in the following three environments: for upsilon in Greek loan-words (system: Greek σύστημα), at the end of a word (rye, city; compare cities, where S is final), and in place of I before the ending -ing (dy-ing, justify-ing).

Consonant
As a consonant in English, Y normally represents a palatal approximant,  (year, yore). In this usage, the letter Y has replaced the Middle English letter yogh (Ȝȝ), which could represent .

Confusion in writing with the letter thorn
When printing was introduced to Great Britain, Caxton and other English printers used Y in place of Þ (thorn: Modern English th), which did not exist in continental typefaces. From this convention comes the spelling of the as ye in the mock archaism Ye Olde Shoppe. But, in spite of the spelling, pronunciation was the same as for modern the (stressed , unstressed ). Pronouncing the article ye as yee is purely a modern spelling pronunciation.

Pronunciation and use

English
As :
 at the beginning of a word as in yes
 at the beginning of a syllable before a vowel as in beyond, lawyer, canyon
As :
 under stress in an open syllable as in my, type, rye, lying, pyre, tyre, typhoon
 in a stressed open syllable as in hyphen, cycle, cylon
 in a pretonic open syllable as in hypothesis, psychology
 word-finally after a consonant, as in ally, unify
As :
 without stress at the end of multi-syllable word, as in happy, baby, lucky, accuracy
 used as a diphthong in combination with e at the end of some words, as in money, key, valley
As non-syllabic :
 in diphthongs at the end of words, as in play, grey, boy
As :
 in a closed syllable without stress and with stress as in myth, system, gymnastics
 in a closed syllable under stress as in typical, lyric
 in an open syllable without stress as in physique, oxygen
Other:

In English morphology, -y is an adjectival suffix.

Y is the ninth least frequently used letter in the English language (after P, B, V, K, J, X, Q, and Z), with a frequency of about 2% in words.

Other languages

It can never be a consonant (except for loanwords).

In Dutch and German,  appears only in loanwords and proper names.

In Dutch, it usually represents . It may sometimes be left out of the Dutch alphabet and replaced with the  digraph.

In German orthography, the pronunciation  has taken hold since the 19th century in classical loanwords – for instance in words like typisch  'typical', Hyäne, Hysterie, mysteriös, Syndrom, System, Typ. It is also used for the sound  in loanwords, such as Yacht (variation spelling: Jacht), Yak, Yeti; however, e.g. yo-yo is spelled "Jo-Jo" in German, and yoghurt/yogurt/yoghourt "Jog(h)urt" [mostly spelled with h]). The letter  is also used in many geographical names, e.g. Bayern Bavaria, Ägypten Egypt, Libyen Libya, Paraguay, Syrien Syria, Uruguay, Zypern Cyprus (but: Jemen Yemen, Jugoslawien Yugoslavia). Meier, another common spelling of the name. In German the y is preserved in the plural form of some loanwords such as Babys babies and Partys parties, celebrations.

A  that derives from the  ligature occurs in the Afrikaans language, a descendant of Dutch, and in Alemannic German names. In Afrikaans, it denotes the diphthong . In Alemannic German names, it denotes long , for instance in Schnyder  or Schwyz  – the cognate non-Alemannic German names Schneider  or Schweiz  have the diphthong  that developed from long .

In Hungarian orthography, y is only used in the digraphs "gy," "ly," "ny," "ty," in some surnames (e. g. Bátory), and in foreign words.

The difference in spelling is thus purely etymological.

In French  can have a diaeresis (tréma) as in Moÿ-de-l'Aisne.

In Spanish,  was used as a word-initial form of  that was more visible. (German has used  in a similar way.) Hence,  was a symbol sharing the initials of Isabella I of Castille and Ferdinand II of Aragon. Appearing alone as a word, the letter  is a grammatical conjunction with the meaning "and" in Spanish and is pronounced . As a consonant,  represents  in Spanish.

It is mostly used in loanwords from English, Japanese and Spanish. Loanwords in general, primarily gallicisms in both varieties, are more common in Brazilian Portuguese than in European Portuguese. It was always common for Brazilians to stylize Tupi-influenced names of their children with the letter (which is present in most Romanizations of Old Tupi) e.g. Nictheroy became Niterói.

Italian, too, has  (ipsilon) in a small number of loanwords. The letter is also common in some surnames native to the German-speaking province of Bolzano, such as Mayer or Mayr.

In Guaraní, it represents the vowel .

It is also used in forming a number of diphthongs. As a consonant it represents .

In Danish, Norwegian, Swedish, Finnish, Karelian and Albanian,  is always pronounced .

In Estonian,  is used in foreign proper names and is pronounced as in the source language.

In Lithuanian,  is the 15th letter (following  and preceding  in the alphabet) and is a vowel. It is called the long i and is pronounced , like in English see.

When used as a vowel in Vietnamese, the letter  represents the sound ; when it is a monophthong, it is functionally equivalent to the Vietnamese letter . There have been efforts to replace all such uses with  altogether, but they have been largely unsuccessful. As a consonant, it represents the palatal approximant. The capital letter  is also used in Vietnamese as a given name.

In Aymara, Indonesian/Malaysian, Turkish, Quechua and the romanization of Japanese, ⟨y⟩ is always a palatal consonant, denoting , as in English.

In Turkmen,  represents .

In Washo, lower-case  represents a typical wye sound, while upper-case  represents a voiceless wye sound, a bit like the consonant in English hue.

Other systems
In the International Phonetic Alphabet,  corresponds to the close front rounded vowel, and the related character  corresponds to the near-close near-front rounded vowel.

The SI prefix for 1024 is yotta, abbreviated by the letter Y.

Related characters

Descendants and related characters in the Latin alphabet
Y with diacritics: Ý ý Ỳ ỳ Ŷ ŷ Ÿ ÿ Ỹ ỹ Ẏ ẏ Ỵ ỵ ẙ Ỷ ỷ Ȳ ȳ Ɏ ɏ Ƴ ƴ
 IPA superscript letters: 𐞠 𐞲 𐞡
 𝼆 : Small letter turned y with belt is an extension to IPA for disordered speech (extIPA)
  is used in the Teuthonista phonetic transcription system
ʸ is used for phonetic transcription
Ỿ ỿ : Y with loop is used by some Welsh medievalists to indicate the schwa sound of

Ancestors and siblings in other alphabets
𐤅: Semitic letter Waw, from which the following symbols originally derive
Υ υ : Greek letter Upsilon, from which Y derives
 : Coptic letter epsilon/he (not to be confused with the unrelated Greek letter Ε ε called epsilon)
𐌖 : Old Italic U/V, which is the ancestor of modern Latin V and U
 : Gothic letter /, which is transliterated as w
У у : Cyrillic letter U, which derives from Greek upsilon via the digraph omicron-upsilon used to represent the sound /u/
Ѵ ѵ : Cyrillic letter izhitsa, which derives from Greek upsilon and represents the sounds /i/ or /v/. This letter is archaic in the modern writing systems of the living Slavic languages, but it is still used in the writing system of the Slavic liturgical language Church Slavonic.
Ү ү : Cyrillic letter Ue (or straight U)
Ұ ұ : Kazakh Short U

Derived signs, symbols and abbreviations
 ¥ : Yen sign
 ⓨ : In Japan, ⓨ is a symbol used for resale price maintenance.

Computing codes

On the standard US/UK keyboard Y is the sixth letter of the top row; On the QWERTZ keyboard used in Central Europe it is replaced there by Z, and is itself positioned at the bottom left.

Other representations

Notes

References

External links

ISO basic Latin letters
Vowel letters